The Gligan is a right tributary of the river Dâmbovnic in Romania. It flows through Gliganu de Jos, a village in Rociu commune. The Gligan flows into the Dâmbovnic upstream from the confluence with the Mozacu.

References

Rivers of Romania
Rivers of Argeș County